Lauri Luik (born on 23 April 1982 in Haapsalu) is an Estonian politician. He has been member of XI, XII and XIII Riigikogu.

In 2004 he graduated from Tallinn University of Technology in computer and systems engineering.

Since 2000 he has been a member of Estonian Reform Party.

References

Living people
1982 births
Estonian Reform Party politicians
Members of the Riigikogu, 2007–2011
Members of the Riigikogu, 2011–2015
Members of the Riigikogu, 2015–2019
People from Haapsalu
Tallinn University of Technology alumni